Entente Sportive Ouargla is an Algerian football club based in Ouargla, Ouargla Province. The club currently plays in the Ligue Régionale de football de Ouargla of the Ligue Régional I.

References

Football clubs in Algeria
Ouargla Province
Sports clubs in Algeria
Association football clubs established in 2009
2009 establishments in Algeria